A total lunar eclipse took place on Friday, November 29, 1974, the second of two lunar eclipses in 1974. The Moon was plunged into darkness for 1 hour, 15 minutes amd 45 seconds, in a deep total eclipse which saw the Moon 28.961% of its diameter inside the Earth's umbral shadow. The visual effect of this depends on the state of the Earth's atmosphere, but the Moon may have been stained a deep red colour. The partial eclipse lasted for 3 hours, 28 minutes and 58.7 seconds in total. The Moon was only 3.6 days before perigee (Perigee on Tuesday, December 3, 1974), making it 1.4% larger than average.

Visibility 
It was completely visible over Europe, Africa, Asia, Australia, Pacific and western North America, seen rising over Eastern Europe, Middle East, Western Asia and east in Africa, and setting over the Pacific Ocean.

Related lunar eclipses

Eclipses in 1974 
 A partial lunar eclipse on Tuesday, 4 June 1974.
 A total solar eclipse on Thursday, 20 June 1974.
 A total lunar eclipse on Friday, 29 November 1974.
 A partial solar eclipse on Friday, 13 December 1974.

Lunar year series

Saros series 

This is the 16th of 26 total lunar eclipses in series 125. The previous occurrence was on November 18, 1956 and the next will occur on December 9, 1992.

Half-Saros cycle
A lunar eclipse will be preceded and followed by solar eclipses by 9 years and 5.5 days (a half saros). This lunar eclipse is related to two annular solar eclipses of Solar Saros 132.

Tritos 
 Preceded: Lunar eclipse of December 30, 1963
 Followed: Lunar eclipse of October 28, 1985

Tzolkinex 
 Preceded: Lunar eclipse of October 18, 1967
 Followed: Lunar eclipse of January 9, 1982

See also 
List of lunar eclipses
List of 20th-century lunar eclipses

Notes

External links 
 

1974-11
1974 in science
November 1974 events